Joseph Hanisch  (24 March 1812  9 October 1892)  was a Bavarian, Roman Catholic organist and conductor. Hanisch was based in Regensburg from 1829 until his death in 1892.

Son of the organist Anton Franz Hanisch.

Life 
Joseph Hanisch was born in Regensburg, Germany on 1 March 1812. His father, Anton Franz Hanisch was the organist of the Basilica of the Nativity of Our Lady, Regensburg (German: Alten Kapelle Regensburg). Joseph's father taught him how to play the organ and in 1829 Hanisch started serious organ lessons under Carl Proske, the organist for the Regensburg Cathedral. After an 1835 trip to Italy in search of compositions from Roman archives, Joseph took an interest in the restoration of Catholic church music.

In 1836 Joseph took over his father's position as the official organist for the Alten Kapelle Regensburg, and worked his way to becoming the organist for the Niedermünster Cathedral in 1866. He also taught harmonica, organ, and musical improvisation lessons at the music school in Regensburg, as well as teaching the young princes The House of Thurn and Taxis.

Joseph also conducted the Regensburg choir from 1859 to 1863, and again from 1867 to 1872.

Family 

The Hanisch family originates from Franz Xaver, born in Silesia, who settled in Regensburg in the 1800s as the court oboist of The House of Thurn and Taxis. From then on, the Hanisch family had a great influence on the musical life of Regensburg.

Franz Xaver Hanisch von Greifenthal (1749-?): Oboist, Piano teacher 1776 until 1806; and composer for The House of Thurn and Taxis.

Anton Franz Hanisch von Greifenthal(1786–1835): Organist in the Basilica of the Nativity of Our Lady, Regensburg from 1808; Father of both Joseph and Max Joseph Hanisch.

Joseph Hanisch (1812–1892): Cathedral Organist in Regensburg from 1829 to 1892; son of Barbara Fuhrmann.

Max Joseph Hanisch (1819–1866): Organist and music teacher at St. Emmeram; Son of Anton Franz and Elisabeth Rosalia Hanisch (1799-1826).

Dorothea Hanisch (1854-1945): Pianist (1786-1835): organist in the Basilica of the Nativity of Our Lady, Regensburg from 1808; father of Joseph and Max Joseph Hanisch.

Impact 

The foundation of Joseph's compositions come from his study of Gregorian Chorals, and the masters of church music. He is mostly regarded for his liturgical organ playing and improvisational skills. Through his various posts as an organist and music teacher, Joseph contributed greatly to the Regensburg musical scene. His work in restoring Catholic church music from Palestine, influenced Franz Xaver Witt to founding the Caecilia Society.

His major compositions are Missa auxilium Christianorum, Quatuor hymni pro festo corporis Christi, and Konzerte für swei Hörner (English: Concert for two horns).

Works cited

References 

German organists
German male organists
19th-century organists
Cathedral organists
19th-century German male musicians
Male classical organists
19th-century German musicians
Musicians from Regensburg